FC Lida is a Belarusian association football club based in Lida, Grodno Oblast.

History
The club was founded in 1962 as Krasnoye Znamya Lida. In 1963, they were renamed to Vympel Lida and in 1971 to Obuvschik Lida. Obuvschik Lida became four-time champion of the Belarusian SSR (1983, 1985, 1986, 1989) and two-time winner of the Super Cup (1984, 1986).

In 1992, the club was included in the Belarusian Premier League, where they played during 1992–1993, 1994–1996 and 1999–2000. During 1993–94, 1997–1998 and since 2001, they have been playing in the Belarusian First League, sans two short drops to the Second League (in 2007 and 2011). Since 1997, the club is known as FC Lida.

Name changes
 1962: Krasnoye Znamya Lida
 1963: Vympel Lida
 1971: Obuvshchik Lida
 1997: FC Lida

Honours
Belarusian SSR League
 Winners (4): 1983, 1985, 1986, 1989
 Belarusian SSR Super Cup
 Winners (2): 1984, 1986

Current squad
As of March 2023

League and cup history

Managers

 Ivan Prokhorov (1992)
 Vladimir Grishanovich (1993)
 Andrey Petrov (1994–1996)
 Henry Romanovsky (1996–1997)
 Ivan Prokhorov (1998–2000)
 Andrey Petrov (2000–2002)
 Vitaly Rashkevich (2002–2004)
 Alexei Shubenok (2004–2005)
 Dmitry Makarenko (2005–2006)
 Igor Frolov (2007)
 Pavel Batyuto / Sergei Petrushevsky (2008)
 Andrey Petrov (2009)
 Sergei Petrushevsky / Sergei Salygo (2010)
 Igor Frolov (2011–2012)
 Andrey Petrov (2013–)

External links
Official website

Football clubs in Belarus
1962 establishments in Belarus
Association football clubs established in 1962